Franklin Township is a township in Bourbon County, Kansas, United States.  As of the 2000 census, its population was 312.

Geography
According to the USGS, it contains two cemeteries: Boulware and Stevenson.

The Little Osage River and smaller streams of Bell Branch, Buck Run, Irish Creek, Limestone Creek, Owl Creek and Ross Branch run through this township.

Further reading

References

External links
 City-Data.com
 Bourbon County Maps: Current, Historic Collection

Townships in Bourbon County, Kansas
Townships in Kansas